Kerman Havanirooz 3rd Combat Base ( – Pādegān-e Havānīrūz) is an army aviation base and village in Ekhtiarabad Rural District, in the Central District of Kerman County, Kerman Province, Iran. At the 2006 census, its population was 5,861, in 1,523 families.

References 

Populated places in Kerman County
Islamic Republic of Iran Army Aviation Bases